Borussia was a  coaster that was built in 1912 by Nüscke & Co, Stettin for German owners. She was renamed Timandra in 1939. She was seized by the Allies at Rendsburg in May 1945, passed to the Ministry of War Transport (MoWT) and renamed Empire Confal. In 1947, she was sold into merchant service and renamed Woodwren. She was renamed Artemis in 1953 and hulked. The hulk was scrapped in 1960.

Description
The ship was built in 1912 by Nüscke & Co, Stettin.

She had a GRT of 948 and a NRT of 528.

The engine was built by Atlas Werke AG, Bremen.

History
Borussia was built for A Kirsten, Hamburg. Her port of registry was Cologne and the Code Letters HWCP were allocated. By 1930, she had been sold to Kölner Reederei AG and was being operated under the management of Edmund Halm & Co. In 1932, she was sold to Rhein-London Linie GmbH. In 1934, her Code Letters were changed to DGWc. In 1939, Borussia was renamed Artemis. This change was not recorded by Lloyds Register, she continued to be listed as Borussia.

In May 1945, Titania was seized by the Allies at Rendsburg. She was passed to the MoWT and renamed Empire Confal. In 1947, she was sold to the General Steam Navigation Co Ltd and renamed Woodwren. In 1953, she was renamed Artemis and converted to a coal hulk, stationed at Gravesend, Kent. She was scrapped in 1960 at Queenborough, Kent.

References

External links
Colour photo of Wooodwren

1912 ships
Ships built in Stettin
Steamships of Germany
Merchant ships of Germany
World War I merchant ships of Germany
World War II merchant ships of Germany
Ministry of War Transport ships
Empire ships
Steamships of the United Kingdom
Merchant ships of the United Kingdom